Dalhousie Station, most commonly known as Dalhousie Springs Station, was a pastoral lease that once operated as a cattle station in South Australia. Dalhousie and other surrounding leases were acquired by the Australian Government in 1985 to make up Witjira National Park.

The ephemeral Finke River passes for a distance of  through the property with several semi-permanent water holes, before petering out well short of Lake Eyre further to the south east.

The lease was initially won by Edward Meade Bagot in 1873. Bagot was a surveyor who had won the contract to construct the  section of the Overland Telegraph from Port Augusta to the Peak.

Bagot and Smith put the  property on the market in 1889. At this time the station was stocked with 5,000 head of cattle and 130 horses.

The property was acquired by the Lewis family and in 1904 was being managed by A. Ross. R. Sandford was running the property in 1924; the same year good rains fell, filling the water-holes along the Finke.

The Dalhousie Homestead Ruins are listed on the South Australian Heritage Register.

See also
List of ranches and stations

References

Stations (Australian agriculture)
Pastoral leases in South Australia
Far North (South Australia)